Atherinomorus insularum is a species of fish in the family Atherinidae.

References 

insularum
Animals described in 1903